Llanbedr Airport , formerly RAE Llanbedr (ICAO: EGOD), is an operational general aviation airport located in the Snowdonia National Park near the village of Llanbedr, Gwynedd, northwest Wales.

History

It opened in 1941 as part of RAF Fighter Command's 12 Group. During its life, the base has been known as:
 RAF Llanbedr until 1957
 RAE Llanbedr until 1992
 T&EE Llanbedr (Test & Evaluation Establishment) until 1995. 
 DTEO Llanbedr (Defence Test & Evaluation Organisation) until 1997
 DERA Llanbedr until 2001, when most of DERA became QinetiQ.

The site was (from Spring 1942) an operational base for Towed Target (and in 1943, became the home of the RAF's No. 12 Fighter Gunnery School), and later, Target Drone services to the UK Armed Forces.  Target provision services were typically to the Cardigan Bay Ranges (UK Danger Area EGD201, under the control of Aberporth) but Llanbedr targets also worked other UK ranges, including the Royal Artillery range off the Hebrides and occasionally overseas.

During the Second World War, RAF Llanbedr was home to thirty-two different RAF Squadrons on rotation who flew a variety of aircraft (Spitfire, Mustang, Typhoon, Anson, Lysander and Martinet). The longest serving Squadron was No. 631 Squadron (RAF) who arrived at Llanbedr in May 1945 from RAF Towyn and stayed until February 1949. The Squadron was re-numbered as No. 20 Squadron RAF.

The following units were here at some point:

Post RAF

From 1957, civilianisation of the base services (typically airfield operation) began with Short Brothers holding a series of contracts until 1979, when Airwork Services took over and held them until 1991. In 1991, contracts and scope of work changed again and FR Serco took over its running.

Secondarily, it served as a Royal Air Force V bomber dispersal airfield, more recently used for military weapons training. The site closed in October 2004. Navigational and ATC equipment was removed by the military and the site put up for sale.

In May 2014 the airport re-opened, catering for the needs of general aviation activities in the area.

Recent events

In recent years, the site has been used for agricultural purposes under the terms of an agreement with the Welsh Government, the current site owners.

It was reported in February 2008 that Welsh Ministers had awarded preferred bidder status for a 125-year lease to the operators of Kemble Airport near Cirencester. In May 2008, the Snowdonia Society, the Brecon Beacons Park Society and the Friends of Pembrokeshire National Park formed an alliance against the development of a new civilian airport at the site without a full public debate "best achieved by making an application for planning permission".

This campaign has been opposed by members of the local population who are in favour of the reuse and redevelopment of the site. A paper-based petition in favour of Kemble's plans for the airfield attracted over a thousand signatures, while an e-petition from the Snowdonia Society received 156.

In December 2008, the Welsh Government gave the go-head for Kemble to take over the airfield, subject to Kemble obtaining the "relevant permissions and consents." In November 2009, the Snowdonia National Park Authority took external legal advice and refused to issue certificates of lawful use to Kemble. In August 2011, a certificate was granted to Llanbedr Airfield Estates for use of the airport to test and develop unmanned aerial vehicles.

In August 2012, permission was granted to turn the airfield into a yard for the dismantling of airliners.

In January 2013 the Welsh Government included the site in the Snowdonia Enterprise Zone.

In June 2014 Fly Llanbedr Limited were awarded their licence to run a flight training and air experience operation from Llanbedr Airfield.

In July 2014 it was named as one of 8 possible locations for the UK spaceport the British government is looking to establish by 2018. The shortlist was reduced to 6 airports in March 2015, with Llanbedr still a candidate. As "Aerospace Wales", the operating company conducts research into future flight systems, including fixed-wing extended-duration drones, to provide cellular network phone coverage to the  Welsh Mountain Rescue Service.

In June 2015 one of the hangars at Llanbedr Airfield was used for the Red Bull Air Race Barnstorming stunt, where Red Bull Air Race pilots Paul Bonhomme and Steve Jones flew two modified Xtreme Air Sbach XA41's in formation through the hangar itself.

In September 2015 the London Gliding Club based in Dunstable, Bedfordshire held an expedition to the airfield in order to take advantage of the unique soaring opportunities that the Site has to offer, which are often not accessible to soaring gliders originating from inland. In three weeks the club achieved 254 movements, with 436 flying hours recorded.

In September 2016 the London Gliding Club based in Dunstable, Bedfordshire held another expedition to the airfield.  In three weeks the club achieved 262 movements, with 455 flying hours recorded.

In October 2018 FlySnowdonia started operating as a flying school from the airfield operating two Robin DR400 aircraft. The airfield is also open to visiting pilots wanting to land but prior permission is required and more information can be found on the FlySnowdonia website.

List of types flown from Llanbedr

Target tug
 Miles Martinet TT.I
 Westland Lysander TT.III
 Bristol Beaufighter TT.10
 de Havilland Mosquito TT.35
 Gloster Meteor TT.20
 English Electric Canberra B.2(TT), TT.18 WH734/WK128

Target drones
 Fairey Firefly U.8, U.9
 Gloster Meteor U.14, U.15, U.16
 GAF Jindivik various marks
 de Havilland Sea Vixen D.3 XS577 & XP924 from 1973 to 1991 latter now G-CVIX with De Havilland Aviation, Bournemouth. Since September 2014 XP924 has moved to Royal Naval Air Station Yeovilton, Somerset. The aircraft is now owned by Naval Aviation Ltd and funded by the Fly Navy Heritage Trust and operated as a display aircraft.

Communication and ferry role
 Avro Anson T.21
 de Havilland Devon C2 XA880 until 1994 
 Piper Aircraft Navajo Chieftain ZF521 from 1994

Fast radar target/shepherding role for unmanned target drones/photochase
 Gloster Meteor
 BAe Hawk T Mk1 (XX154) Pre-production
 BAe Hawk T1A (XX160/XX170/XX172) loaned from RAF Fleet ex Valley
 Hawker Hunter FGA Mk9 (XE601) loaned from Boscombe Down
 Alpha Jet (ex GAF)

References

Bibliography

External links

 

Transport in Gwynedd
Buildings and structures in Gwynedd